Johannes Nicolaj Hansen   (20 February 1855 - 25 December 1932) was a Danish composer and violinist.

Selected works
Brødrene Ranzau (skuespil 1887)
Den Anden April (skuespil 1887)
Uden Midtpunkt (skuespil 1887)
Lette Dragoner (operette 1892)
Daphnis og Chloe (operette 1905)
Kongens Hjerte (skuespil 1913)

See also
List of Danish composers

References
This article was initially translated from the Danish Wikipedia.

Danish composers
Male composers
Danish classical violinists
Male classical violinists
1855 births
1932 deaths